Buellia sulphurica is a species of saxicolous (rock-dwelling),  crustose lichen in the family Caliciaceae. Found in the Galápagos Islands, it was described as new to science in 2011 by Frank Bungartz and André Aptroot. Here, near the sulphur vents, it was found growing on basalt rock; nearby vegetation included Adianthus concinnum and Tournefortia rufosericea. It has additionally been recorded on the Chico volcano, also on Isabela Island. The specific epithet sulphurica alludes to both the bright yellow colour of the thallus, and the proximity of the lichen to sulphur vents. Buellia sulphurica contains rhizocarpic acid, a secondary compound that is rare in genus Buellia.

References

sulphurica
Lichen species
Lichens described in 2011
Lichens of the Galápagos Islands
Taxa named by André Aptroot